Oxford Academy may refer to:

Oxford Academy (California), Cypress, California
Oxford Academy (Connecticut), Westbrook, Connecticut
Oxford Academy, Oxfordshire, Oxford, United Kingdom
Oxford Academy & Central Schools, Oxford, New York
Oxford Academy for the Gifted, Northborough, Massachusetts

See also
 Oxford School (disambiguation)
 Oxford High School (disambiguation)
 Oxford College (disambiguation)
 Oxford University (disambiguation)